Sierra de Agalta National Park is a national park in Honduras. It was established on 1 January 1987 and covers an area of 207.85 square kilometres. It has an altitude of between 1,800 and 2,354 metres.

References

National parks of Honduras
Protected areas established in 1987
1987 establishments in Honduras
Central American pine–oak forests
Central American dry forests
Central American Atlantic moist forests